Dugesia aenigma is a species of dugesiid triclad that inhabits freshwater bodies of Cephalonia, Greece.

Phylogeny 
The most inclusive molecular analysis of Dugesia carried out shows that D. aenigma is closely related with other Greek species, mainly with those inhabiting the Ionian Sea.

References

Aenigma
Animals described in 1984
Endemic fauna of Greece
Cephalonia